ArgoFilms is a production company specializing in documentary filmmaking. Established in 1990, ArgoFilms has received six Emmy Awards, a duPont-Columbia Award for Journalism, four Genesis Awards, and over one hundred other awards internationally.

Allison Argo, who serves as producer, director, writer, editor, and narrator for ArgoFilms, began the company with the goal of "lending a voice to those who cannot speak for themselves." The company focusing especially on endangered species and captive animal issues.

Frogs: The Thin Green Line, Chimpanzees: An Unnatural History, and Crash: A Tale of Two Species are acclaimed documentaries produced in collaboration with National Geographic and PBS. In total, ArgoFilms has created fifteen films for National Geographic and PBS.  
 
Currently in pre-production at ArgoFilms is The Story of Dao, the company’s first feature film.

History

In the late 1980s, Allison Argo encountered a captive gorilla named Ivan living inside a shopping mall in Tacoma, Washington. For over two decades, Ivan had lived in a concrete enclosure without exposure to natural light or other gorillas.  Prompted by this encounter, Argo left her career as an actress to produce films on conservation and captive animal welfare.

The Urban Gorilla, directly inspired by Ivan’s condition, took three years for ArgoFilms to complete as their first production.  The team included Allison Argo as writer, director, and producer; Argo’s then-husband, Director of Photography Robert E. Collins, as principal cinematographer; and Glenn Close as narrator.  The film, broadcast by National Geographic, was nominated for two national Emmys, and  received a 1992 Alfred I. duPont–Columbia University Award.
 
After the success of The Urban Gorilla, National Geographic approached Argo to discuss further collaboration. This led to ArgoFilms’ second documentary, Keepers of the Wild, for which Argo won a 1992 National Emmy for Directing. Filming for Keepers of the Wild spanned Kenya, Belize, Canada, and the US, starting ArgoFilms’ international travel. Argo wrote, directed, and produced the film, with Glenn Close once again performing as narrator.

Productions
Since 1990, ArgoFilms has produced 14 documentaries, as well as shorter films to support wildlife and conservation causes. The company frequently collaborates with National Geographic Television, PBS, and Thirteen/WNET. Six of ArgoFilms’ documentaries were produced for the PBS Nature series.

ArgoFilms is in pre-production for The Story of Dao, the company’s first full-length feature film. The film is based on the life of an elephant named Pang Dao, whom Argo first encountered during the filming of The Urban Elephant for PBS Nature and National Geographic. 
 
The Story of Dao began pre-production in 2011. The film’s six-week scout in Southeast Asia was funded by a Kickstarter campaign, which received over $25,000 from over 200 backers.

References

External links

 ArgoFilms official website
 ArgoFilms at the Internet Movie Database

Documentary film production companies
Film production companies of the United States
Mass media companies established in 1990
1990 establishments in Massachusetts